Lenox Square is a shopping mall in the Buckhead district of Atlanta, Georgia. The mall is currently owned and managed by Simon Property Group, and is considered a sister mall to the adjacent, Simon-owned Phipps Plaza. , the mall is anchored by department stores Bloomingdale's, Macy's, and Neiman Marcus.

Lenox Square opened to the public on August 3, 1959, operating as an open-air shopping center much like a typical lifestyle center. Its original anchors were two of the most famous and acclaimed department stores in the area, Rich's and Davison's, and grocery chain Colonial Stores. The mall opened with 60 stores. Over the next few decades competition from new suburban shopping malls spurred four expansions.

Lenox Square houses several upscale stores that do not have other locations within several hundred miles of Atlanta. These include Audemars Piguet, Zegna, David Yurman,  Diesel,  Fendi, Louis Vuitton, Cartier, Salvatore Ferragamo, Burberry, G-Star Raw,  UGG, Ted Baker, Tesla Motors, CH Carolina Herrera, Kiehl's, Prada, Van Cleef & Arpels, and Rolex. It also has the largest Pottery Barn in their chain as well as one of the largest Forever 21 stores in the Southeastern United States.

History
Lenox Square was the work of Ed Noble, a former developer from Kansas City, Missouri, whose company  J. Noble Properties, acquired the site in 1956.  Groundbreaking for the shopping center occurred in July 1957, and it was completed on June 29, 1958. The public opening ceremony for Lenox Square was held on August 3, 1959.

The three-level mall – Mall. Plaza and Market – featured  of retail space. It was anchored by Rich's, Davison's, and a Colonial Stores supermarket. There were 52 original tenants, including a bowling alley, indoor golf driving range, and a Kresge five and dime store. The Mall Level concourse featured several statues depicting Uncle Remus characters, such as Br'er Fox, Br'er Frog and the Tar Baby. A movie theater opened on the Market Level in June 1963. 

Within its first few years Lenox Square would be a part of several major events in the city. It is the starting point in the annual Peachtree Road Race, one of the largest 10 kilometer races in the world. Davison's, owned by Macy's since 1924, was rebranded as Macy's in 1986. In 2000, the celebration of the Rich's Great Tree moved to the flagship store from Underground Atlanta, after having been held downtown for decades.

In 1991, Rich's relocated their flagship store to Lenox Square from downtown Atlanta. In 2003, Federated Department Stores began integrating the Macy's name with their other regional department store brands, including Rich's. Following the news, the Lenox Macy's location closed and the building (along with the location at Perimeter Mall) was renovated extensively to house the first Bloomingdale's in the South, which opened in October 2003. In 2005, Federated Department Stores dropped the regional names of all of their department stores. The former Rich's-Macy's location at Lenox Square became the flagship of Macy's Central until all of the company's divisions had consolidated into one.

Lenox Square is the third largest shopping mall in the state, as well as one of the largest in the Southeast. Only the Mall of Georgia and Perimeter Mall have a larger gross leasable area.

Visited by more than 35 million people a year, Lenox Square is one of the most popular and profitable retail centers in the United States. Together with Phipps Plaza, an estimated $1 billion was generated in 2007. An estimated 40% of all visitors to the shopping center in 2009 were tourists.

Renovations
Lenox Square has undergone four major renovations and expansions, significantly spurred by competition from new suburban retail such as Perimeter Mall and Cumberland Mall. In keeping with a then current retail trend, a major renovation and expansion in the early 1970s enclosed the entire shopping center. It included a new wing and the addition of the first Neiman Marcus location outside of Texas and Florida. It is still to this day the company's only location in the state.

A second expansion completed in 1980 added a three-level section at the back of the mall which included a food court. This replaced the previous open-air Plaza Court and supermarket. Lenox Square then encompassed 1.04 million leasable square feet. The new food court was soon joined by a 19-story, 370,000 sqft (gross), class-A office building, a twin-like 24-story hotel, 1,800 space, five-level partially submerged combined hotel-office parking garage (two below ground), and 800-space four-level retail pre-cast concrete parking deck. These were adjacent to the MARTA's Lenox transit station, which opened in December 1984.

In 1995, the mall underwent its largest expansion, adding a second story above the original Mall Level. The expansion made Lenox Square the largest shopping center in Georgia, with 1.457 million square feet (140,000 m²) divided among 200 stores and restaurants. This distinction was relinquished to the newly built,  Mall of Georgia in 1999.

The shopping center then housed 1.545 million leasable square feet and 240 stores and services.

In Fall 2013 another renovation took place in the mall with additions of both exterior and interior with new lightning, landscaping, windowing, and many more. The renovations were completed as of 2014.

Shootings and Robberies
Seven shootings occurred at Lenox Square in 2020.

A robbery occurred outside of the mall in 2021 after it was closed.

After a string of shootings and robberies, the mall now has security measures in place and requires people under the age of 18 to have adult supervision after 3 pm.

Around Lenox
Lenox Square is connected via parkway to the 27-story JW Marriott Buckhead hotel, classified as a 4-Diamond hotel by the AAA. Many other luxury hotels are within walking distance from Lenox. These include W Hotel, The Whitley, and properties belonging to the Grand Hyatt, InterContinental, Waldorf Astoria, and Westin chains.

The area around Lenox has grown immensely in the past few decades following its opening, with expanding retail developments and over 75 restaurants within a mile radius, which has made the area a highly desirable location to live and work. A two-story Target store sits across from Lenox at Lenox Marketplace, connected inside via escalators and elevators designed for shopping carts as well as shoppers, and having checkouts on both levels at the exits to a parking deck. Other stores at Lenox Marketplace include Dick's Sporting Goods and Publix. The Sembler Company was the developer. In addition, Phipps Plaza is located to the northeast of Lenox Square across Peachtree Road. Traffic levels around Lenox are high and the streets are confusing for those unfamiliar with the area. Georgia 400 opened in 1993, restricting traffic to and from the west after it cut many existing roads. However, the BUC (Buckhead Uptown Connection), the free shuttle bus service around Buckhead, is available, supported voluntarily by a self-taxing district (Buckhead CID) which includes Lenox, and by GRTA and other agencies. MARTA, the city's main mass transit system, provides one station across the street from the J W Marriott, as well as the Buckhead station a quarter mile Northwest on Peachtree Road.

Several companies, such as AT&T Mobility, have their headquarters near the shopping center.

Shops Around Lenox
The area surrounding Lenox Square contains a 125,000 square foot open air retail center, The Shops Around Lenox. Anchored by a Crate & Barrel, it includes 16 retail stores, smaller specialty stores, restaurants, and workout studios. The center was built in 1979, underwent a major redevelopment during the recession and was sold by the developers in 2014 for $71.8 million. A full list is detailed below.

List of anchor stores

See also

List of shopping malls in the United States
Phipps Plaza
Buckhead Village District

References

External links
Lenox Square Mall (official site)
Sky City: Lenox Square Mall
Mall Hall of Fame article
 ToNeTo Atlanta

Buildings and structures in Fulton County, Georgia
Simon Property Group
Shopping malls established in 1959
Buildings and structures in Atlanta
Shopping malls in the Atlanta metropolitan area
Tourist attractions in Atlanta
1959 establishments in Georgia (U.S. state)